Sheikh Chadae Stadium or Stadium Club Al Akhdar, or is a multi-purpose stadium in Bayda, Libya. It is currently used mostly for football matches and is the home ground of Al Akhdar Al Bayda'. The stadium holds 7,000 people, and sometimes up to 10,000 people.

References

External links
Frh News (Arabic)

Sports venues in Libya
Football venues in Libya
Multi-purpose stadiums in Libya